Thomas Erickson Watt (born 14 February 1956) is an English actor, writer and broadcaster, known for portraying the role of Lofty Holloway in the BBC One soap opera EastEnders. He is also known for his appearances on the BBC radio show Fighting Talk and his documentary films for BT Sport.

Career

Acting 
Born in Wanstead, Watt studied drama at Manchester University where he directed several stage productions. One of his first television roles was in the comedy series Never the Twain in 1981, but his big break came in 1985 when he was cast as one of the original characters in the BBC One soap opera, EastEnders. Watt portrayed the role of Lofty Holloway, the barman of The Queen Vic from the show's inception until 1988.

Other acting credits have included roles in the BBC drama South of the Border, a South London detective show; the role of Norman in the 1990 film for ITV called And the Nightingale Sang, a love story set during the war; Boon 1992, with Michael Elphick; as well as a minor role in the 1992 film Patriot Games, among others.

As well as television and film he has had many theatre and stage roles. Most notably, he starred in the one-man show Fever Pitch, based on the Nick Hornby novel of the same name. Watt appeared in an episode of the BBC TV series New Tricks, had a minor role in Guy Ritchie's Sherlock Holmes and appeared in a production of 'Madness In Valencia'.

In 2019, Watt reprised his role as Lofty Holloway in EastEnders for one episode, for the funeral of Harold Legg.

Television and radio
After leaving EastEnders, Watt began presenting sports segments for Channel 4, Radio 1, Radio 3, Radio 5 Live, talkSPORT, and Cable TV. He has also written, presented and produced several documentaries about football for BT Sport Films, including the Football Outposts series. Watt featured regularly on BBC Radio 5 Live's Fighting Talk, where we he won the "Champion of Champions" trophy on 28 May 2011. He also hosted Arsenal TV's Monday night Fans Forum until the show was discontinued. He also produced, directed and presented the Channel 4 children's sports show, Rookies in the early 1990s.

Music
Watt recorded a version of Bob Dylan's Subterranean Homesick Blues in 1985, with members of the British band New Order among other artists. The single peaked at number 67 in the UK singles chart.

Writing
Watt wrote match reports and features for The Observer for several years.  He has authored nine books about football, including The End, A Passion for the Game, A Beautiful Game and the legacy book for the 2010 World Cup in South Africa. He was the ghost-writer for the David Beckham autobiography, My Side, which won a special prize at the British Book Awards. In 2017, Watt wrote 13 Years In Heaven with Thomas Salme.

Personal life
Watt was once romantically involved with his EastEnders castmate Anita Dobson, who played Angie Watts.  He married his wife in 1993 and they have since had a son, Roland.

Watt is currently an advisory board member for BounceBack, a charity that trains ex offenders.

Filmography

Film

Television

References

External links 
 
 
 

1956 births
Alumni of the University of Manchester
English association football commentators
English radio DJs
English sports broadcasters
English male soap opera actors
English male stage actors
Living people
People from Wanstead
English male film actors